Roseline Granet (born 1936) is a French sculptor and painter.

Granet studied at the Art Students League of New York in 1954.

Public art
In 1987 Granet was commissioned by the city of Paris to produce a statue of the French philosopher Jean Paul Sartre, which was placed permanently in the courtyard of the Bibliothèque nationale de France in Paris.

In 2005, she created a bust of the poet Émile Nelligan, now permanently installed in the Saint-Louis Square, Montréal. Her bronze sculpture of Quebec painter Jean Paul Riopelle, titled Le Grand Jean-Paul, is installed in Place Jean-Paul Riopelle in Montreal.

Collections
Her work is included in the collection of the Musée national des beaux-arts du Québec, the City of Montreal public art collection and the Mauermuseum, Berlin.

References

Living people
1936 births
20th-century French women artists
21st-century French women artists
French sculptors